Lee Won-Shik (born May 16, 1973) is former South Korean football player for mostly Bucheon SK in South Korea. 

He was a part of the South Korea team that competed at the 1996 Summer Olympics, and has worked as a manager of the Jeju United youth academy as of 2008.

Club career statistics

References

“즐기는 축구문화가 바탕이 돼야” 제주Utd. 유소년클럽 이원식 감독  - The people who makes the K-League

External links
 
 FIFA Player Statistics

1973 births
Living people
Association football forwards
South Korean footballers
Jeju United FC players
FC Seoul players
Daejeon Hana Citizen FC players
K League 1 players
Korea National League players
Footballers at the 1996 Summer Olympics
Olympic footballers of South Korea
Sportspeople from Daegu